Gerd Ashvan (also Romanized as Gerd Āshvān) is a village in Lahijan Rural District, in the Central District of Piranshahr County, West Azerbaijan Province, Iran. At the 2006 census, its population was 170, in 26 families.

References 

Populated places in Piranshahr County